Gubernatorial elections in 1998 took place in ten regions of the Russian Federation.

Overview 
1998 saw the re-election of the heads of administrations of the "first wave" elected in April 1993 in Lipetsk, Penza and Smolensk Oblasts and Krasnoyarsk Krai, as well as the presidents of Bashkortostan, Buryatia, Ingushetia and North Ossetia and the chairman of the government of Karelia. For the first time, direct elections were held in Mordovia. The transition to a presidential system was discussed in the last two parliamentary republics, Dagestan and Udmurtia. In Dagestan, on June 25, the Chairman of the State Council Magomedali Magomedov was re-elected for a new term by the Constitutional Assembly, same as in 1994. In Udmurtia, members of the State Council constantly rejected bills on direct elections introduction, proposed by the Council's speaker.

Race summary

References

Gubernatorial elections in Russia
1998 elections in Russia